Interlochen Public Radio (IPR), established in 1963, is the National Public Radio member network for Northern Michigan.   It broadcasts classical music and news on five stations in the northwestern Lower Peninsula.  It is operated by the Interlochen Center for the Arts, with studios on the center's campus in Interlochen, Michigan; just outside Traverse City.  It carries programming from NPR and Public Radio International.

At one point early in the 2000s, IPR led the nation in annual listener support.  This was all the more remarkable because it is the second-smallest NPR member in Michigan, and one of the smallest in the entire NPR system.

History
Joseph E. Maddy, founder of the National Music Camp (now the Interlochen Center for the Arts), had long wanted to bring a fine arts radio station to Northern Michigan.  In 1963, WIAA signed on for the first time.  Originally broadcasting eight hours per day, it grew enough within a decade to become a charter member of NPR.  Interlochen Public Radio became a network in 1989 with the addition of WICV. Interlochen bought contemporary Christian station WDQV in 2005 and converted it into a third satellite for the eastern portion of the market, WIAB.

In 2000, Interlochen signed on WICA at 91.5, and by 2001 all NPR news and talk programming moved there from WIAA/WICV.  However, WICA does not have nearly the signal strength of WIAA.  As a result, Cadillac, the second-largest city in IPR's service area, does not have a clear signal for NPR talk programming; WICA's signal in Cadillac is marginal at best. This is true even after the addition of two repeaters for WICA since the turn of the millennium.

In 2018, Interlochen sold WICV to Northern Christian Radio for $150,000, and the station adopted a Christian format as an affiliate of The Promise FM.

Stations
Since 2000, IPR has operated a two-service network. "Classical IPR" (formerly known as "IPR Music Radio") provides classical music and hourly NPR news updates for three stations. News and talk programming from NPR and other sources is heard on three stations, branded as "IPR News Radio".

References

Sources
Michiguide.com - WIAA History
Michiguide.com - WIAB History
Michiguide.com - WICA History
Michiguide.com - WICV History

External links
 

Classical music radio stations in the United States
NPR member networks